Loxley Hall is an early-19th-century country house near Uttoxeter, Staffordshire, now occupied by a Staffordshire County Council special school for boys with learning difficulties. It is a Grade II* listed building.

An early manor house on the site was owned by the Ferrers family and from the 14th century following the marriage of the Ferrers heiress, by a branch of the Kynnersley family (Sneyd-Kynnersley from 1815).

In the 18th century a substantial mansion was built on the site, the main entrance front to the south having eleven bays, the central three bays pedimented, and two storeys with dormers. The east wing was of five bays.

Alfred Tennyson wrote the Locksley Hall poems after a mansion of the same name in Staffordshire, former country house of Thomas Kynnersley. 

In the early 19th century the house was remodelled and enlarged. A third storey under a hipped roof was added and the east wing was extended to seven bays.

See also
Grade II* listed buildings in East Staffordshire
Listed buildings in Uttoxeter Rural

External links 

   Images of England: Loxley Hall
 Burkes History of the Commoners of Great Britain and Ireland (1835) pp166–169. Sneyd-Kynnersley of Loxley Park

References

Grade II* listed buildings in Staffordshire
Uttoxeter